Mukesh is an epithet for the Hindu god Shiva, and literally means "conqueror of the Muka demon". It also means god of 3 worlds, heaven, hell & earth, which in turn represents Hindu god Shiva. It is commonly used as a male given name in India. People with the name Mukesh include:
 Mukesh (singer) (1923–1976), Indian playback singer from 1940s-1970s Hindi cinema
 Mukesh (actor) (born 1956), Indian film actor and producer
 Mukesh Agnihotri (born 1962), Indian politician
 Mukesh Ambani (born 1957), chairman and managing director of Reliance Industries Limited
 Mukesh Batra (born 1951), homeopathy practitioner 
 Mukesh Bhatt (born 1952), Indian film producer
 Mukesh Chhabra (born 1980), casting director in Bollywood
 Mukesh Choudhary (born 1996), Indian cricketer
 Mukesh Goud (born 1959), Indian politician belonging to the Indian National Congress
 Mukesh Haikerwal (born 1960), general practitioner and former federal president of the Australian Medical Association who is now a Companion of the Order of Australia. 
 Mukesh Jagtiani (born 1952), Dubai-based Indian businessman, Chairman Landmark International Group
 Mukesh Kapila (born 1955), British civil servant and United Nations official
 Mukesh Khanna (born 1958), Indian television and film actor
 Mukesh Kumar (field hockey) (born 1970), Indian field hockey player
 Mukesh Kumar (golfer) (born 1965), Indian golfer
 Mukesh Kumar (cricketer) (1993), Indian cricket player
 Mukesh Kumar Chawla (born 1974), Pakistani Politician 
 Mukesh Narula (born 1962), Indian cricket player and coach
 Mukesh Rishi (born 1956), Indian film actor
 Mukesh Tiwari (born 1969), Indian actor

See also 
 

Indian masculine given names

fr:Mukesh
gu:મુકેશ
sa:मुकेश
tr:Mukesh